Scranton is a town in Florence County, South Carolina, United States. The population was 932 at the 2010 census. It is part of the Florence Metropolitan Statistical Area.

Geography
Scranton is located in southern Florence County at  (33.917414, -79.743378). U.S. Route 52 passes through the town, leading north  to Florence, the county seat, and south  to Lake City.

Demographics

As of the census of 2000, there were 942 people, 314 households, and 226 families residing in the town. The population density was 1,132.0 people per square mile (438.2/km2). There were 347 housing units at an average density of 417.0 per square mile (161.4/km2). The racial makeup of the town was 42.36% White, 56.05% African American, 0.32% Native American, 0.32% from other races, and 0.96% from two or more races. Hispanic or Latino of any race were 1.17% of the population.

There were 314 households, out of which 35.4% had children under the age of 18 living with them, 42.7% were married couples living together, 25.2% had a female householder with no husband present, and 28.0% were non-families. 24.5% of all households were made up of individuals, and 8.3% had someone living alone who was 65 years of age or older. The average household size was 2.53 and the average family size was 2.97.

In the town, the population was spread out, with 23.2% under the age of 18, 7.6% from 18 to 24, 25.5% from 25 to 44, 21.8% from 45 to 64, and 21.9% who were 65 years of age or older. The median age was 40 years. For every 100 females, there were 82.9 males. For every 100 females age 18 and over, there were 82.1 males.

The median income for a household in the town was $24,605, and the median income for a family was $27,292. Males had a median income of $25,600 versus $19,118 for females. The per capita income for the town was $13,094. About 23.1% of families and 25.8% of the population were below the poverty line, including 31.0% of those under age 18 and 19.1% of those age 65 or over.

References

External links

Towns in Florence County, South Carolina
Towns in South Carolina
Florence, South Carolina metropolitan area